Jonathan James Williams (26 October 1942 – 31 August 2014) was a British racing driver.

Born in Cairo, Egypt, he participated in one Formula One World Championship Grand Prix, on 22 October 1967. He finished 8th, scoring no World Championship points.

His racing career began in the early 1960s, competing in saloons and various junior formulae, graduating to Formula Three in 1963 and in 1966 drove for the de Sanctis team. During this time he worked with the young Sir Frank Williams, Sheridan Thynne and Piers Courage.

In 1967, he was signed by Scuderia Ferrari, initially competing in sports car racing. That year, Ferrari lost several drivers, including team leader Lorenzo Bandini who died from injuries sustained at that year's Monaco Grand Prix and Williams' sports car co-driver, Günter Klass, killed during practice at the Mugello Circuit in July. Later that year, Williams was offered a drive in F1, but after only one Grand Prix he was dropped by Ferrari and a subsequent F1 project with Abarth did not come to fruition. However, he did compete in some Formula Two events in 1968 winning the Rhine Cup race in a car entered by Sir Frank Williams, before driving the works Serenissima. In 1969 he helped develop the De Tomaso F1 car for Frank Williams as well as continuing to compete in F2.

He continued also to be active in sports car racing. At the 1970 24 Hours of Le Mans, he co-drove the Porsche 908/02 which carried cameras for the Steve McQueen movie Le Mans.

Williams retired from racing in 1972 and became a pilot, (initially for Alessandro de Tomaso) an occupation he claimed to dislike and subsequently a writer and photographer.

Williams died on 31 August 2014, aged 71.  He appeared in the documentary film Steve McQueen: The Man & Le Mans, released nine months after his death and which closes with a clip of Williams driving in the 1971 film Le Mans.

Racing record

Complete Formula One World Championship results
(key)

Complete European Formula Two Championship results
(key)

References

External links

1942 births
2014 deaths
English racing drivers
English Formula One drivers
Ferrari Formula One drivers
24 Hours of Le Mans drivers
World Sportscar Championship drivers
Sportspeople from Cairo